Evening Falls is an album by Norwegian guitarist and composer Jacob Young released on the ECM label in 2004.

Reception

AllMusic awarded the album 4 stars and in its review by Thom Jurek, states "What is immediately startling about Evening Falls is its lyricism, and how it doesn't sound like a guitarist's date. Young's compositions reflect the notion of song, overtly paying careful attention to nuance and dynamic. Inside his deep and winding lyricism is plenty of room for improvisation and group interplay". The Guardian called it "A lyrical, softly swaying debut from a thirtysomething Norwegian acoustic and electric guitarist who, despite his youth, has worked with some of the luminaries of the Scandinavian scene". On All About Jazz John Kelman wrote "Evening Falls heralds the international arrival of an artist who, with a number of years behind him, has already developed a mature and personal approach. As a player, composer and bandleader he will clearly be someone to watch"

Track listing 
All compositions by Jacob Young except as indicated
 "Blue" – 7:19  
 "Evening Air" – 6:48  
 "Minor Peace" – 6:19  
 "Looking for Jon" – 4:29  
 "Sky" – 5:00  
 "Presence of Descant" (Young, Jon Christensen) – 3:56  
 "Formerly" – 6:48  
 "The Promise" – 4:25  
 "Falling" – 4:47

Personnel 
Jacob Young – guitar 
Mathias Eick – trumpet 
Vidar Johansen – bass clarinet, tenor saxophone
Mats Eilertsen – bass 
Jon Christensen – drums

Credits 
Engineered by Jan Erik Kongshaug 
Design by Sascha Kleis
Liner photos by Colin Eick 
Produced by Manfred Eicher

Notes 
Recorded at Rainbow Studio in Oslo, Norway in December 2002

References 

ECM Records albums
Jacob Young (musician) albums
2004 albums
Albums produced by Manfred Eicher